The Bengal Film Journalists' Association Awards (Also Known as BFJA awards) is the oldest Association of Film critics in India, founded in 1937. Bengal Film Journalists' Association – Best Actress Award is given by Bengal Film Journalists' Association to recognize a female actor who has delivered an outstanding performance in a leading role. The award was first given in 1942 for the films released in preceding year 1941.

Frequent winners of this award are Aparna Sen (5 awards), Madhabi Mukherjee, Rituparna Sengupta (4 awards each), Suchitra Sen, Debashree Roy, (3 awards each).

Year-wise winners of this award

Here is a list of the award winners and the films for which they won.

Multiple award winners 
 5 Awards: Aparna Sen
 4 Awards: Rituparna  Sengupta, Madhabi Mukherjee
 3 Awards: Suchitra Sen, Debashree Roy, Laboni Sarkar
 2 Awards: Kanan Devi, Vyjayanthimala, Sumitra Devi, Sandhya Roy, Indrani Haldar

See also
 Bengal Film Journalists' Association Awards
 Cinema of India

References 

hi am priyanka tiwari serial me roll mil skata hi

External links
 https://web.archive.org/web/20090804072545/http://www.bfjaawards.com/

Bengal Film Journalists' Association Awards
Film awards for lead actress